The 2017 SMU Mustangs football team represented Southern Methodist University in the 2017 NCAA Division I FBS football season. The Mustangs played their home games at Gerald J. Ford Stadium in Dallas, Texas, and competed in the West Division of the American Athletic Conference. They were led by third-year coach Chad Morris during the entire regular season until December 6, when he resigned to become the head coach at Arkansas. On December 11, SMU hired Sonny Dykes as head coach, and he led them in their bowl game. They finished the season 7–6, 4–4 in AAC play to finish in a tie for third place in the West Division. They were invited to the Frisco Bowl where they lost to Louisiana Tech.

Previous season 
The Mustangs finished the 2016 season 5–7; they were 3–5 in American Athletic play, to finish in fifth place in the West Division.

Schedule Source:

Schedule
SMU announced its 2017 football schedule on February 9, 2017. The schedule consisted of 7 home and 5 away games in the regular season. The Mustangs hosted AAC foes UConn, Tulane, Tulsa, and UCF, and traveled to Cincinnati, Houston, Tulane, and UCF. The Mustangs hosted three of the four non-conference opponents, Arkansas State from the Sun Belt Conference, North Texas from Conference USA and Stephen F. Austin from the Southland Conference, and traveled to TCU of the Big 12 Conference.

With a 7–5 regular season result, the team was invited to the 2017 Frisco Bowl, to face Louisiana Tech on December 20.

Weekly awards
 Jordan Wyatt – Bronko Nagurski National Defensive Player of the Week, AAC Defensive Player of the Week
 Trey Quinn – Earl Campbell Tyler Rose Award Player of the Week, AAC Offensive Player of the Week

Game summaries

Stephen F. Austin

North Texas

at TCU

Arkansas State

UConn

at Houston

at Cincinnati

Tulsa

UCF

at Navy

at Memphis

Tulane

vs. Louisiana Tech–Frisco Bowl

Players in the 2018 NFL Draft

References

SMU
SMU Mustangs football seasons
SMU Mustangs football